Juan Máximo Reynoso Guzmán (born December 28, 1969 in Lima) is a Peruvian professional manager and former footballer. He started his playing career in his native Peru where he played for Alianza Lima from 1986 to 1990. He made over 230 appearances with Cruz Azul where he served as captain and let the team to a historic treble in the 1996–97 season. He later joined Necaxa and retired in 2004 after making playing over 75 games. 

At the international level Reynoso capped for the Peru, with 84 appearances from 1986 to 2000, serving as captain from 1993 to 1999. He represented the team at five Copa America tournaments in 1987, 1989, 1993, 1995 and 1999. He also captained the team to reach the semi finals of 2000 CONCACAF Gold Cup his final tournament.

Club career 
Reynoso started his career in Peru, where he played for Alianza Lima from 1986 to 1990. He later joined Spanish club Sabadell in 1990, with the club featuring in the Segunda División at the time.

In his only season with the Barcelona-based club, he played 14 league matches and returned to Alianza Lima the following year. He stayed with Alianza Lima until 1992 before signing for fellow Peruvian club Universitario  in January 1993. In his first season with the club he won his first career title as the club won the Peruvian Primera División in the 1993 season.

In July 1994, he moved to Mexico and joined Liga MX Cruz Azul where he would end up playing for eight years from 1994 to 2002. He won the CONCACAF Champions' Cup in 1996 with the club.

During the 1996–97 season he was a key member of the Cruz Azul side that won 1996–97 Copa México after they won by a 2–0 victory over Toros Neza in the final.

In 1997, he captained the club to the Primera División de México Invierno 1997 title ending a 17-year championship drought. Alongside that he led them to retain their CONCACAF Champions' Cup for the 1997 season after Los Angeles Galaxy 5–2 in the final, completing a continental treble, the second time in the club's in history. He joined Mexican club Necaxa in 2002. In 2004, he announced his retirement from playing football after almost 20 years of playing.

International career 
Reynoso obtained 84 international caps for his national team, in which he scored five goals. He made his debut on January 28, 1986 against PR China (1-3), when he was aged sixteen (and 31 days). Reynoso played his last international match for his native country on February 23, 2000 against Colombia (1–2). He served as captain of the side from 1993 to 1999. He featured in five Copa America tournaments namely 1987, 1989, 1993, 1995 and 1999.

He also captained the team to reach the semi finals of 2000 CONCACAF Gold Cup his final tournament.

Managerial career 
Reynoso started his coaching career immediately after retiring at Club Necaxa in 2004 and was appointed as the assistant coach of the club serving under Raúl Arias. He played that role until 2006.

Bolognesi 
In 2007, he returned to his native Peru and was appointed as the head coach of Coronel Bolognesi. He led the club to their first league title in the history of the club (78 years) by winning the 2007 Torneo Clausura.

In 2012, he returned to his former Cruz Azul to serve as the assistant coach to Enrique Meza, the coach who signed him for the club in 1994. He moved on to serve as the head coach of Cruz Azul Hidalgo from 2013 to 2014.

Melgar 
Reynoso moved back to his native Peru and signed for Melgar in January 2014. In 2015, he led the club to the 2015 Torneo Clausura and ultimately the 2015 Peruvian Primera División to end their 34-year championship drought. in 2017, he also led the team to the 2017 Torneo de Verano beating UTC via a penalty shootout in the finals after a 2–2 aggregate in the double legged final. This resulted in him winning his third league title at the end of his three year tenure.

Puebla 
After his exploits with Melgar, he moved back to Mexico in October 2019 to serve as the assistant coach to Enrique Meza, this time at Liga MX club Puebla. After spending two years with as assistant at Puebla, in March 2019, he returned to Peru to serve the head coach of Real Garcilaso, now Cusco FC.

After five months, he returned to  Puebla as he had been appointed as their new head coach in August 2019. During the 2020 Liga MX Apertura, he led the club to eliminate reigning champions Monterrey in a penalty shootout to qualify to the quarter-finals. During the quarter-finals, they defeated eventual winners Leon by 2–1 in the first leg, however they were beaten 2–0 by Leon in the second leg of the quarterfinals and were eliminated by 3–2 on aggregate. Following the club's quarterfinal exit from the tournament, he was sacked in December 2020. During his tenure he guided Puebla to 14 wins, eight draws and 19 losses. He was later replaced by Nicolás Larcamón.

Cruz Azul 
In January 2021, Reynoso was appointed the head coach of his former club Cruz Azul, replacing Luis Armando González who was working in a caretaker role. He won his four out of his first six matches in charge picking up the 12 points, the highest in a Cruz Azul's manager's debut in the last six years. 

On May 31, 2021, he led Cruz Azul in making history by winning the Liga MX when Cruz Azul beat Santos Laguna 2–1 on aggregate in the final to claim the Guardianes 2021 season title. It was the club's ninth in all, but the first in 24 years, ending a title drought for the Los Azules since 1997 when he captained them to win the trophy. With the win he also became the club's first foreign-born manager to win the title. He also became the first to win a league title as both a player and a coach for Cruz Azul in the club's history.

On July 18, 2021, Reynoso led Cruz Azul to the 2021 Campeón de Campeones beating León by 2–1 at Dignity Health Sports Park in Carson, California.  The match was between Liga MX season's Apertura and Clausura champions with León being the Apertura Champion.

On 18 May 2022, Reynoso was dismissed by  Cruz Azul.

Peru 
On 3 August 2022, Reynoso was presented as the new Head Coach of Peru's national football team, after the successful management of Ricardo Gareca. He left Mexico, and interestingly enough, his 1st match would be against Mexico with a disappointing 1-0 loss. He would pick up his 1st win with Peru on September 27, 2022 in a dominant 4-1 win against El Salvador. He would then win against Paraguay and Bolivia, both 1-0 just before the Qatar 2022 World Cup.

Career statistics

International

International goals 

 Scores and results list Peru's goal tally first.

Managerial statistics

Honours

Player 
Universitario de Deportes

 Peruvian Primera División: 1993

Cruz Azul

 Primera División de México: Invierno 1997
Copa Mexico: 1996–97
CONCACAF Champions' Cup: 1996, 1997

Manager 
Bolognesi

 Torneo Clausura: 2007

Universitario de Deportes

 Peruvian Primera División: 2009

FBC Melgar

 Torneo Clausura: 2015
 Peruvian Primera División: 2015
 Torneo de Verano: 2017

Cruz Azul

 Liga MX: Guardianes 2021
 Campeón de Campeones: 2021

Individual
 Liga MX Best Manager: 2020–21
 Liga MX All-Star: 2021

References

External links
 
 Interview in peru.com
 Juan Reynoso at Footballdatabase

1969 births
Living people
Footballers from Lima
Peruvian footballers
Peru international footballers
Association football defenders
Club Alianza Lima footballers
CE Sabadell FC footballers
Club Universitario de Deportes footballers
Cruz Azul footballers
Club Necaxa footballers
Peruvian Primera División players
Liga MX players
La Liga players
Peruvian expatriate footballers
Expatriate footballers in Spain
Expatriate footballers in Mexico
Peruvian expatriate sportspeople in Mexico
Peruvian football managers
Expatriate football managers in Mexico
Coronel Bolognesi managers
Club Universitario de Deportes managers
Juan Aurich managers
Sporting Cristal managers
FBC Melgar managers
1987 Copa América players
1989 Copa América players
1993 Copa América players
1995 Copa América players
1999 Copa América players
2000 CONCACAF Gold Cup players
Peruvian expatriate football managers
Cusco FC managers